The Walton Common banjo enclosure is a banjo enclosure on Walton Common, to the north of Walton in Gordano, Somerset, England.
It appears to date to the late Iron Age, and may have been a high-status settlement.
The term "banjo" refers to the shape. It is a round enclosure approached by a straight avenue, with the enclosure and avenue bounded by banks and ditches.
The banks have been worn down and the ditches filled in over time, so it is scarcely noticeable from the ground.
It showed up on photographs from the air taken in 1930 and 1946.
Since then the site has become more overgrown and is hard to detect even from the air.

Location

The enclosure is on the Walton Down at ST 4289 7377, to the northeast of village of Walton in Gordano.
The earthwork banks and ditch were detected from aerial photographs from 1930 and 1946.
Since then many of the features have been hidden by encroaching vegetation.
The earthworks are obscured by gorse, scrub, brambles and small bushes.
They have been affected by ant hills, which often are found on former pastures, and by a rabbit warren from the Middle Ages.
Two round Bronze Age barrows were found in a 1931 field survey on Walton Down near to the banjo enclosure.

Similar banjo enclosures elsewhere have been dated to the middle and late Iron Age.
The enclosure may have been used to hold livestock or for a seasonal pastoral settlement.
Earthworks of this form found in Ireland were used as sheep pens.
However, recent research suggests that most banjo enclosures were settlement sites, and may have been occupied by people of high status.

The enclosure is one of just four that have been noted in Somerset by English Heritage, and is the easiest to see from the ground since the land has not been farmed for many years.
It can be accessed by a medieval pathway that crosses the site.

Description

The enclosure is oval, about  along the WSW-ENE axis and  along the NNW-SSE axis.

There are entrances on the south and north east sides, approached by paths between parallel banks.
Two parallel banks extend  in a WSW-ENE direction from the ENE side.
A linear NE-SW earth bank crosses the end of the avenue formed by these bank at right angles, with a  gap in the centre.
The 1946 photograph shows what is probably a bomb crater in the ENE avenue.

Notes

Sources

Iron Age sites in Somerset